Jack Nomani Tiki Vare (born 14 February 1986) is a Papua New Guinean cricketer.  Vare is a right-handed batsman who fields as a wicket-keeper.

Having played age group cricket for Papua New Guinea Under-19s in the 2004 Under-19 World Cup, he proceeded to be selected as a part of the Papua New Guinea squad for the 2011 World Cricket League Division Three, where he played 6 matches, helping them earn promotion to 2011 World Cricket League Division Two.  It was in this competition that he made his List A debut against Bermuda.  He played a further 5 List A matches in the competition, the last coming against Hong Kong.  In his 6 matches in the competition, he scored 81 runs at a batting average of 13.50, with a high score of 28.  Behind the stumps he took 9 catches.
In the ICC Cricket World Cup Qualifier, he scored a brisk 96 off 59 balls (7x4, 7x6) against Netherlands at Pukekura Park in New Plymouth.

International career
Vare made his One Day International debut for Papua New Guinea on 8 November 2014 against Hong Kong in Australia. He made his Twenty20 International debut for Papua New Guinea against Ireland in the 2015 ICC World Twenty20 Qualifier tournament on 15 July 2015.

References

External links
Jack Vare at ESPNcricinfo
Jack Vare at CricketArchive

1986 births
Living people
Papua New Guinean cricketers
Papua New Guinean sportsmen
Papua New Guinea One Day International cricketers
Papua New Guinea Twenty20 International cricketers
Papua New Guinean cricket captains
Wicket-keepers